Charles Eugène Parent (18 November 1894 – 12 June 1961) was a Liberal party and Independent Liberal member of the House of Commons of Canada. He was born in Quebec City, Quebec and became a lawyer by career.

He was first elected to Parliament at the Quebec West and South riding in the 1935 general election then re-elected there in 1940. From 23 November 1944 until the 1949 election, Parent was not a member of the Liberal party but instead sat as an Independent Liberal. Parent and several other Quebec Liberal MPs had broken with their party as a result of the Conscription Crisis of 1944, quitting the Liberal caucus in order to oppose the government's decision to deploy National Resources Mobilization Act conscripts overseas. Previously, conscripts had only been used for "home defence" and kept within Canada. He ran and was re-elected as an "Independent Liberal" in the 1945 federal election.

When the Quebec West and South riding was dissolved, Parent became the candidate at the expanded Quebec West riding which he won as an official Liberal candidate in the 1949 election. Parent lost to J.-Wilfrid Dufresne of the Progressive Conservative party in the 1953 election.

His father, Simon-Napoléon Parent, was a Premier of Quebec and a mayor of Quebec City. Charles Parent's brother, Georges Parent, was a Senator and also a member of the House of Commons.

Electoral record

References

External links
 

1894 births
1961 deaths
Independent Liberal MPs in Canada
Liberal Party of Canada MPs
Members of the House of Commons of Canada from Quebec
Lawyers in Quebec
Politicians from Quebec City